Howard Wing (28 January 1916 – 7 March 2008) was a Chinese cyclist. He competed at the 1936 Summer Olympics and the 1948 Summer Olympics.

References

External links
 

1916 births
2008 deaths
Chinese male cyclists
Olympic cyclists of China
Cyclists at the 1936 Summer Olympics
Cyclists at the 1948 Summer Olympics
Cyclists from Amsterdam
Dutch male cyclists